{{DISPLAYTITLE:C10H20O3}}
The molecular formula C10H20O3 may refer to:

 Hydroxydecanoic acids
 10-Hydroxydecanoic acid
 Myrmicacin (3-hydroxydecanoic acid)
 Promoxolane

Molecular formulas